Gary Michael Gray (born February 23, 1945) is a former American basketball player who played as a guard in the NBA.

Early years
Gary Gray was born in Fort Cobb, Oklahoma. Gray is Native American, of the Delaware Nation. Following graduation from Fort Cobb High School in 1963, he attended Oklahoma City University, where he led them to the All-College Tournament championship in 1966.  His OCU Chiefs made the 1966 NCAA Men's Basketball Tournament. 
Gray was named an Academic All American for 1966–1967 by the College Sports Information Directors of America (CoSIDA).

Professional basketball career
Gray was drafted in the third round of the 1967 NBA draft by the Cincinnati Royals. He was also selected in the 1967 American Basketball Association Draft by the Dallas Chaparrals.
He spent the 1967–68 season with the Royals, averaging 2.4 points per game in limited playing time. He was later selected by the Milwaukee Bucks in the 1968 NBA Expansion Draft.

Retirement
Gary Gray was inducted into the OCU Basketball Hall of Fame in 1986.

References

1945 births
Living people
American men's basketball players
Basketball players from Oklahoma
Cincinnati Royals draft picks
Cincinnati Royals players
Delaware Nation people
Native American basketball players
Oklahoma City Stars men's basketball players
People from Caddo County, Oklahoma
Shooting guards
20th-century Native Americans
21st-century Native Americans